Sascha Studer (born 3 September 1991) is a former Swiss professional goalkeeper.

Career 
Studer remains the youngest player ever to have started a game in the Swiss Super League, on 1 April 2007. He was 15 years, 6 months and 18 days old at the time. He played the entire game in Sion for his team FC Aarau, which finished in a draw (1-1).

He spent two months on loan at Challenge League club FC Wohlen as backup for Reto Felder and Romeu Leite and 2008 at FC Concordia Basel. He also spent the second half of the season on loan in the 3. Liga at the German club SV Babelsberg 03 during the 2012–13 season.

On 24 July 2014, Studer signed for Mansfield Town following a successful trial, including a clean sheet in a pre-season victory over Leeds United.

Studer announced on his social media pages on 12 July 2015 that following weeks of deliberation, he had decided to retire and pursue a career outside of football.

References

External links 
Swiss Football League profile
FC Aarau profile
 Sascha Studer Interview

1991 births
Living people
Swiss men's footballers
Association football goalkeepers
FC Concordia Basel players
FC Wohlen players
FC Aarau players
SV Babelsberg 03 players
Mansfield Town F.C. players
Swiss Super League players
Swiss Challenge League players
English Football League players
Swiss expatriate footballers
Swiss expatriate sportspeople in Germany
Swiss expatriate sportspeople in England
Expatriate footballers in Germany
People from Olten District
3. Liga players
Sportspeople from the canton of Solothurn